In data processing, a scratch tape is a magnetic tape that is used for temporary storage and can be reused or erased after the completion of a job or processing run. During the early years of computing, when magnetic tape was the primary form of mass storage, many programs, notably sorting routines, required such temporary storage.

See also
 Scratch space – contemporary equivalent
 Merge sorting tape drives – paradigm application

References

Computer storage tape media